Bernard Mannes Baruch (August 19, 1870 – June 20, 1965) was an American financier and statesman.

After amassing a fortune on the New York Stock Exchange, he impressed President Woodrow Wilson by managing the nation's economic mobilization in World War I as chairman of the War Industries Board. He advised Wilson during the Paris Peace Conference. He made another fortune in the postwar bull market, but foresaw the Wall Street crash and sold out well in advance. 

In World War II, he became a close advisor to President Roosevelt on the role of industry in war supply, and he was credited with greatly shortening the production time for tanks and aircraft. Later he helped to develop rehabilitation programs for injured servicemen. In 1946, he was the United States representative to the United Nations Atomic Energy Commission (UNAEC), though his Baruch Plan for international control of atomic energy was rejected by the Soviet Union.

Early life and education
Bernard Baruch was born to a Jewish family on August 19, 1870, in Camden, South Carolina. His parents were Belle (née Wolfe) and Simon Baruch, a physician. He was the second of four sons, including brothers Herman B. Baruch, Sailing Wolfe Baruch, and Hartwig Nathaniel Baruch.

In 1879, the family moved from Camden to New York City, where Bernard and his brothers attended local schools. He studied at and graduated from the City College of New York.
Baruch married Annie Griffin, an Episcopalian, of New York. They had three children: Belle Baruch; Bernard Baruch Jr.; and Renée Baruch.

Career
Baruch became a broker and then a partner in A.A. Housman & Company. With his earnings and commissions, he bought a seat on the New York Stock Exchange for $19,000 ($552,960 in 2016 dollars). There, he amassed a fortune before the age of 30 speculating on the sugar market, which was booming in Hawaii. Baruch founded the Intercontinental Rubber Company of New York, which dominated the guayule rubber market in the U.S. with holdings in Mexico.  His partners in the enterprise were Senator Nelson Aldrich, Daniel Guggenheim, John D. Rockefeller, Jr., George Foster Peabody and others. By 1903, Baruch had his own brokerage firm and gained the reputation of "The Lone Wolf of Wall Street" because of his refusal to join any financial house. By 1910, he had become one of Wall Street's best-known financiers.

In 1925, Baruch endowed the United Daughters of the Confederacy (UDC) Mrs. Simon Baruch University Award in memory of his mother, to support scholars who had written unpublished monographs for full-length books on Confederate history. His mother had been an early member of the organization and supported its activities.

Bernard Baruch had made millions in the US bull market in stocks since 1924. He began to anticipate a Wall Street crash as early as 1927 and sold stocks short periodically in 1927 and 1928.
On September 25, 1929, after the 1929 post Labor Day peak of the Dow, Baruch refused to join a bull pool of financiers to support the declining market.
He advised humorist Will Rogers to exit the market before the crash. "I did what you told me," Rogers told Baruch when the two met after the Black Tuesday crash of October 29, 1929, "and you saved my life".

Presidential adviser: First World War
In 1916, Baruch left Wall Street to advise President Woodrow Wilson on national defense and terms of peace. He served on the Advisory Commission to the Council of National Defense and, in January 1918, became the chairman of the new War Industries Board. With his leadership, this body successfully managed the US's economic mobilization during World War I. In 1919, Wilson asked Baruch to serve as a staff member at the Paris Peace Conference. Baruch did not approve of the reparations that France and Britain demanded of Germany, and he supported Wilson's opinion that there needed to be new forms of cooperation, as well as the creation of the League of Nations.

For his services in support of the war effort, Baruch was awarded the Army Distinguished Service Medal with the following citation: The President of the United States of America, authorized by Act of Congress, July 9, 1918, takes pleasure in presenting the Army Distinguished Service Medal to Mr. Bernard M. Baruch, a United States Civilian, for exceptionally meritorious and distinguished services to the Government of the United States, in a duty of great responsibility during World War I, in the organization and administration of the War Industries Board and in the coordination of allied purchases in the United States. By establishing a broad and comprehensive policy for the supervision and control of the raw materials, manufacturing facilities, and distribution of the products of industry, he stimulated the production of war supplies, coordinated the needs of the military service and the civilian population, and contributed alike to the completeness and speed of the mobilization and equipment of the military forces and the continuity of their supply. War Department, General Orders No. 15 (1921)

Interwar

In the 1920s and 1930s, Baruch expressed his concern that the United States needed to be prepared for the possibility of another world war. He wanted a more powerful version of the War Industries Board, which he saw as the only way to ensure maximum coordination between civilian business and military needs. Baruch remained a prominent government adviser during this time, and supported Franklin D. Roosevelt's domestic and foreign policy initiatives after his election.

Baruch was also a major contributor to Eleanor Roosevelt's controversial initiative to build a resettlement community for unemployed mining families in Arthurdale, West Virginia.

This relationship did not stop the Nye Committee from investigating Baruch's role in war profiteering.

In 1940, responding to pleas to help Harry Truman's shoestring bid for reelection to the U.S. Senate, Baruch provided crucial funding.

Presidential adviser: Second World War

When the United States entered World War II, President Roosevelt appointed Baruch a special adviser to the director of the Office of War Mobilization. His offices at this time were at 120 Broadway. He supported what was known as a "work or fight" bill. Baruch advocated the creation of a permanent super-agency similar to his old Industries Board. His theory enhanced the role of civilian businessmen and industrialists in determining what was needed and who would produce it. Baruch's ideas were largely adopted, with James Byrnes appointed to carry them out. It is estimated that these policies cut two years off the time taken to produce tanks, bombers, etc. and caught Hitler totally by surprise. During World War II, Baruch remained a trusted adviser and confidant of President Roosevelt, who in 1944 spent a month as a guest at Baruch's South Carolina estate, Hobcaw Barony.

In February 1943, Roosevelt invited Baruch to replace the widely criticized War Production Board head Donald M. Nelson. Baruch had long coveted the job, and responded that he only needed to ask his doctor if he was healthy enough for the post. During the delay, however, presidential advisor Harry Hopkins persuaded Roosevelt that firing Nelson at the army's demands would make him look weak, and when Roosevelt and Baruch met at the White House, Roosevelt declined to discuss the job offer further.

In 1944, Baruch commissioned a committee of physicians which developed recommendations for the formal establishment of the medical specialty of Physical Medicine and Rehabilitation and provided over a million dollars of funding to many medical schools to further this cause. Baruch's father, Simon Baruch, had been a surgeon and was the first teacher of physical medicine at Columbia. In the same year, Baruch and Dr. Howard Rusk, an Air Force physician, advised President Roosevelt to expand rehabilitation programs for injured soldiers within all the armed forces. After the war, these programs were adopted by the Veterans' Administration.

In 1946, President Harry S. Truman appointed Baruch as the United States representative to the United Nations Atomic Energy Commission (UNAEC). On Friday, June 14, 1946, Baruch presented his Baruch Plan, a modified version of the Acheson–Lilienthal plan, to the UNAEC, which proposed international control of then-new atomic energy. The Soviet Union rejected Baruch's proposal as unfair given the fact that the U.S. already had nuclear weapons; it proposed that the U.S. eliminate its nuclear weapons before a system of controls and inspections was implemented. A stalemate ensued.

Baruch resigned from the commission in 1947. His influence began to diminish, as his opinions grew further out-of-step with those of the Truman administration.

Park bench statesman
Baruch was well-known, and often walked or sat in Washington, D.C's Lafayette Park and in New York City's Central Park. It was not uncommon for him to discuss government affairs with other people while sitting on a park bench. This became his most famous characteristic and was also referenced in parody in the 1949 Bugs Bunny animated short, Rebel Rabbit.

Winston Churchill and Baruch were personal friends, and Churchill sometimes stayed in Baruch's New York home when visiting the United States.

In 1960, on his ninetieth birthday, a commemorative park bench in Lafayette Park across from the White House was dedicated to Baruch by the Boy Scouts. A life-size bronze of Baruch sitting on a park bench is in the lobby at Baruch College's Vertical Campus at 1 Bernard Baruch Way in NYC.

Both Baruch and Adlai Stevenson chose to donate their personal papers to Princeton University not only out of their mutual admiration for Woodrow Wilson, but also their mutual friend, Dean Mathey.

He continued to advise on international affairs until his death on June 20, 1965, in New York City, at the age of 94. His funeral at Temple Shaaray Tefila, the family synagogue, was attended by 700 people. His grave is at Flushing Cemetery, Flushing, Queens, New York City.

Thoroughbred racing
Baruch owned a string of thoroughbred racehorses and raced under the name "Kershaw Stable". In 1927, his horse, Happy Argo, won the Carter Handicap.

Legacy and honors
 Baruch College of the City University of New York was named for him.
 The Saratoga Race Course named the Bernard Baruch Handicap in his honor.
 He was referenced in an episode of The Donna Reed Show,The Dick Van Dyke Show (Season 2, Episode 28 "Divorce"), Leave It To Beaver, The Patti Duke Show, Make Room for Daddy as well as in The Burns and Allen Show and the 1959 Art Buchwald book, A Gift From the Boys.
 He was awarded an honorary Doctor of Laws degree in 1933 by Oglethorpe University.

His daughter, Belle Baruch, an avid sportsperson, never married. His son, Bernard Baruch Jr., married Winifred Beatrice Mann, but the marriage ended in a divorce. They did not have any children. His daughter Renee married Henry Robert Samstag. They did not have any children.

Purchase of Hobcaw Barony  

Between 1905 and 1907, Baruch purchased approximately 16,000 acres (63 square kilometers) of the former 18th century Hobcaw Barony, consolidating 14 plantations located on a peninsula called Waccamaw Neck between the Winyah Bay and the Atlantic Ocean, in Georgetown County, South Carolina. He developed sections of the property as a winter hunting resort and later sold the property to his eldest child, Belle W. Baruch. Upon her death in 1964, the property was transferred to The Belle W. Baruch Foundation as the Hobcaw Barony educational and research preserve. The property also includes 37 historic buildings representing the 18th and 19th century rice cultivation industry, and early-to-mid 20th century winter resorts. The entire property was named to the National Register of Historic Places on November 2, 1994.

The Trustees of The Belle W. Baruch Foundation subsequently selected the University of South Carolina and Clemson University as educational institutions with a mandate to preserve and study the Hobcaw Barony, including the wetlands forest and coastal ecosystems. The University of South Carolina established the Belle W. Baruch Institute for Marine and Coastal Sciences, and Clemson University established the Belle W. Baruch Institute for Marine and Coastal Sciences. Both universities have also formed partnerships with other schools in South Carolina that carry out research and educational programs which contribute to knowledge of coastal ecosystems.

The Belle W. Baruch Foundation and the North Inlet-Winyah Bay National Estuarine Research Reserve jointly operate the Hobcaw Barony Discovery Center and provide tours and special programs.

Screen portrayals
Francis X. Bushman portrayed Bernard Baruch in Wilson (1944)

Larry Gates portrayed Bernard Baruch in Funny Lady (1975)

Sam Wanamaker portrayed Bernard Baruch in Winston Churchill: The Wilderness Years (1981)

Assessment
According to historian Thomas A. Krueger: 
For half a century Bernard Baruch was one of the country's richest and most powerful men. A great speculator, public official, presidential counselor, political benefactor, and indefatigable almoner, his public life provides a clear view of the inner workings of the American political system.

See also 
 Continental, Arizona

Notes

References

Primary sources
 Bernard M. Baruch. Baruch: My Own Story (1957). . Two volumes.
 Bernard M. Baruch. The Making of the Reparation and Economic Sections of the Treaty 1920.
 Bernard M. Baruch. American Industry in War: A Report of the War Industries Board (March 1921). ed. by Richard H. Hippelheuser; 1941.

Scholarly secondary sources
 
 

 Cuff, Robert D. "Bernard Baruch: Symbol and myth in industrial mobilization." Business History Review (1969): 115-133. online
 Gerber, Larry G. "The Baruch Plan and the origins of the Cold War." Diplomatic History 6.1 (1982): 69-96.

 
  Eisenhower worked closely with Baruch in 1930.
 

 ; online review
 Schwarz, Jordan A. The New Dealers: Power politics in the age of Roosevelt (Vintage, 2011) pp 32-38. online

 

 Нехамкин Эрнст.БЕРНАРД БАРУХ. Их помнит Нью-Йорк 
 Preclík, Vratislav. Masaryk a legie (Masaryk and legions), váz. kniha (book), 219 pages, vydalo nakladatelství (publisher) Paris Karviná, Žižkova 2379 (734 01 Karvina, Czech Republic) (in cooperation with Masaryk Democratic Movement, Prague), 2019,

External links

 
 Bernard M. Baruch Papers at the Seeley G. Mudd Manuscript Library, Princeton University
 Bernard Baruch writings and speeches, 1919–1958, held by the Billy Rose Theatre Division, New York Public Library for the Performing Arts
 Bernard Baruch Portrait
 Bernard Baruch – Jewish Virtual Library
 Annotated bibliography for Bernard Baruch from the Alsos Digital Library for Nuclear Issues
 Brown, Gates: Baruch, Bernard Mannes, in: 1914-1918-online. International Encyclopedia of the First World War.
 FBI file on Bernard Baruch at the Internet Archive
 FBI files on Bernard Baruch at vault.fbi.gov

1870 births
1965 deaths
American financiers
American investors
American people of German-Jewish descent
Jewish American philanthropists
American political consultants
American racehorse owners and breeders
American stockbrokers
American stock traders
Baruch College
Burials at Flushing Cemetery
Businesspeople from South Carolina
City College of New York alumni
Jewish American government officials
People from Camden, South Carolina
United States presidential advisors
U.S. Synthetic Rubber Program
Franklin D. Roosevelt administration personnel
People of the Cold War
Recipients of the Distinguished Service Medal (US Army)
Civilian recipients of the Distinguished Service Medal (United States)
 
Council of National Defense